Purkey is a surname. Notable people with the surname include:

Bob Purkey (1929–2008), American baseball player
Harry R. Purkey (1934–2018), American politician
Wesley Ira Purkey (1952–2020), American convicted murderer

See also
 Burki (surname)

German-language surnames